Morrall is a surname. Notable people with the surname include:

Clare Morrall (born 1952), English novelist
Earl Morrall (1934–2014), American football player
George Morrall (1905–1955), English footballer
 (1947–2010), American author
Paul Morrall (born 1956), Renowned SCUBA diving pioneer in Technical Diving and photographer

See also
Morrill (disambiguation)